HVV is the public transport body in Hamburg, Germany Hamburger Verkehrsverbund.

It may also refer to:
 Hopewell Valley Vineyards, in New Jersey, United States
 HVV Den Haag, a Dutch football club
 Santa María Del Mar Huave language, spoken in Mexico
 Survivor: Heroes vs. Villains, the 20th season of the CBS reality series Survivor.